M. Raven Metzner is an American screenwriter and producer.

Career
Raven started his career with the movie Elektra before moving on to television projects such as Clue, Falling Skies and Sleepy Hollow. Metzner later replaced Scott Buck as the showrunner for Iron Fist starting with season 2.

Personal life
Raven is married to Catherine Nicora. Raven has a son named Orion from a former relationship. On April 11, 2017, Raven and Catherine had a daughter named Penelope Midnight.

Filmography

Film

Television

References

External links

Living people
American producers
American television producers
American television writers
American screenwriters
Date of birth missing (living people)
Place of birth missing (living people)
Year of birth missing (living people)